Jay Mya (born 18 October 1985 in Rotherham

Discography

Singles

References

External links

English male singers
English dance musicians
English male rappers
Living people
People from Rotherham
Musicians from Sheffield
1985 births